Spiritual literature is a genre of literature, in which usually involves the personal spiritual experience of the author, in form of diary, autobiography, self-dialogue etc..

Famous spiritual literature 
 Vägmärken (Markings) by Dag Hammarskjöld (1963)
 Old Path White Clouds: Walking in the Footsteps of the Buddha by Thích Nhất Hạnh (1991)
 The Seven Storey Mountain by Thomas Merton (1948)

Literary genres
Religious literature